Staroyumranovo (İśke Yomran) is a rural locality (a village) in Rasmekeyevsky Selsoviet, Kushnarenkovsky District, Bashkortostan, Russia. The population was 94 as of 2010. There are 2 streets.

Geography 
Staroyumranovo is located 22 km west of Kushnarenkovo (the district's administrative centre) by road. Rasmekeyevo is the nearest rural locality.

References 

Rural localities in Kushnarenkovsky District